Guido Podestà (born 1 April 1947 in Milan) is an Italian politician and Member of the European Parliament for North-West with the Forza Italia, part of the European People's Party and sits on the European Parliament's Committee on the Internal Market and Consumer Protection. He was elected president of the province of Milan on 2009/06/22, replacing the centre-left candidate Filippo Penati, whom he beat in a runoff vote.

He is a substitute for the Committee on Agriculture and Rural Development
and the Committee on the Environment, Public Health and Food Safety.

Education 
 Graduate in architecture
 Member of the Presidential Committee of Forza Italia (since 2002), national official responsible for 'European enlargement and relations with Eastern Europe'

Career 
 since 1994: Member of the European Parliament
 Vice-President of the European Parliament (1997–2004), with responsibility for relations between the European Parliament and the national parliaments of the 15 Member States, relations with the enlargement countries, Balkan non-candidate countries and the Conference of Community and European Affairs Committees of Parliaments of the European Union
 Chairman of the EP Intergroup on senior citizens
 President of the province of Milan

See also
 2004 European Parliament election in Italy

External links 
 
 

1947 births
Living people
Forza Italia MEPs
MEPs for Italy 2004–2009
MEPs for Italy 1999–2004
Presidents of the Province of Milan